Polyphaenis sericata, the Guernsey underwing, is a moth of the family Noctuidae. The species was first described by Eugenius Johann Christoph Esper in 1787. It is found in Europe and Asia.

The larvae feed on various herbaceous plants, including privet, honeysuckle and dogwood.

References

External links

Fauna Europaea
Lepiforum e.V.
Schmetterlinge-Deutschlands.de

Hadeninae
Moths of Europe
Taxa named by Eugenius Johann Christoph Esper